The  is a class of PLH type patrol vessels of the Japan Coast Guard (JCG; former Maritime Safety Agency, MSA). In the official classification, Shikishima and Akitsushima are treated as the only ships in their classes, respectively; and Reimei is treated as the lead ship of her class. The Shikishima class was once the world's largest coast guard vessel until it was surpassed by the Chinese  in 2015.

Backgrounds 
Spent nuclear fuel generated at the nuclear power plants in Japan has been processed at nuclear reprocessing plants in Britain and France, into plutonium and radioactive waste. Then, according to the plan of power generation with the MOX fuel, the Government of Japan decided to transport this plutonium back to Japan.

In the first transportation from France in 1984, armed JMSA officers were on board the ship to counter maritime hijacking. A second transportation operation was planned in the early 1990s, but due to the revision of the Japan-U.S. Nuclear power agreement in 1988, it was requested to strengthen the security system and the JMSA was to escort with a special tactical team (one of the ancestors of the Special Security Team) and a patrol vessel. On existing patrol boats, however, it was difficult to complete an escort operation with no port of call. For this operation, the JMSA developed Shikishima under the FY 1989 program as an escort ship with a high endurance and enhanced surveillance capability.

Although the transportation of plutonium was not carried out thereafter, Shikishima has been valuable as a large offshore platform that can be used for various security matters and long-distance rescue. As construction cost was expensive, construction of sister ships was not realized easily, but in the 2000s, in order to emphasize countermeasures against the piracy problems of the Malacca Strait and the Somali coast, the Senkaku Islands issue, conservation of marine interests In response to the change, construction was considered again. In response, the second ship constructed in the 2010 fiscal year plan was Akitsushima.

Design 
Like preceding PLHs, they have a long forecastle, but its internal structure is strengthened that the level of vulnerability resistance is comparable to warship standard. Bulletproof of the bridge structure is pretty much taken into consideration, polycarbonate bulletproof glass is prepared inside the window, metal fittings for the ballistic board are also attached to the outer wall.

Shikishima is the only JCG vessel equipped with anti-air radar and Oerlikon 35 mm twin cannons to enhance anti-air capability whereas preceding patrol vessels have only surface-search and navigation radars and a single-mounted 35 mm or L/60 40 mm autocanon. And as a secondary weapon, two JM61 20 mm gun systems were set up. This system adopts the same rotary cannon as the conventional JM61-M, but it is remotely controlled with an optical director as opposed to JM61-M being manually trained and elevated. It derived from one of the PG-821-class guided-missile patrol boats of the JMSDF, and later, added as a standard equipment of the JCG as the JM61-RFS. In Akitsushima, L/70 40 mm autocanons are introduced in combination with Bofors Mk. 3 single-mounted turrets, instead of 35 mm twin cannons. In Reimei-class that followed, lighter Mk. 4 turrets are introduced.

Aviation facilities have also been enhanced. In Shikishima, two Eurocopter AS332 Super Puma helicopters are deployed as the shipboard helicopters, whereas the conventional PLHs are equipped with smaller Bell 212. The air facilities of Akitsushima are further expanded to operate an even larger EC225LP, which is also followed by the Reimei-class.

In service
At present, she is frequently sent on long cruises to Southeast Asia to foster international cooperation against piracy in the Strait of Malacca. She is also assigned to the policing mission of Senkaku Islands because of her cruising capability.

Slopes and handrails were set up so that both elderly Majesties could get on board comfortably.

Due to the increased activities of the China Coast Guard and the introduction of the Zhaotou class, the Japan Coast Guard procured three additional Shikishima-class vessels between 2016 and 2018 due to the need to "strengthen security around the Senkaku islands".

Ships in the class

See also
 List of Japan Coast Guard vessels and aircraft

References

Bibliography

External links

 PLH31Shikishima - Japan Coast Guard Annual Report 2004 
 PLH32 Akitsushima launches - Japan Coast Guard Annual Report 2013 
 Delivering PLH32 Akitsushima - Japan Marine United Corporation press release 

Patrol vessels of the Japan Coast Guard
 
Patrol ship classes